The 1894 Chicago Maroons football team represented the University of Chicago during the 1894 college football season. The Maroons played a record number of games over the course of the season, though they did not win a record number of games and considered many of their contests in August and September as practices.

Schedule

Roster

Head coach: Amos Alonzo Stagg (3rd year at Chicago)

References

Chicago
Chicago Maroons football seasons
Chicago Maroons football